Elizabeth Cudjoe  (born 17 October 1992) is a Ghanaian footballer who plays as a forward for the Ghana women's national football team. She made her international debut at the FIFA U-17 Women's World Cup New Zealand 2008. She was part of the senior national team at the 2011 All-Africa Games where she scored against Algeria and at the 2014 African Women's Championship. At the club level, she played for Hasaacas Ladies in Ghana.

International goals

References

External links
 FIFA profile

1992 births
Living people
Ghanaian women's footballers
Ghana women's international footballers
Place of birth missing (living people)
Women's association football forwards
Hasaacas Ladies F.C. players